Thomas James Copa (born October 30, 1964) is an American former professional basketball player. After graduating from Marquette he went on to play professionally in the NBA and in Europe. Born in Robbinsdale, Minnesota, he was named Minnesota Mr. Basketball in 1983.

College career
Copa played college basketball for Marquette Warriors from 1983 to 1987. In 120 career games, he averaged 8.2 points and 4.7 rebounds per game.

Professional career
Although chosen with the 44th pick in the 1987 CBA draft, Copa moved to Vail, Colorado after graduating where he worked as a shuttle-bus driver from the Stapleton Airport to Vail for the winter. The following summer, he attended a camp for European scouts where he had an good showing and was eventually signed by Belgian club Maccabi Brussels. He spent three seasons in Belgium, including the 1990–91 season where he averaged 21.2 points and 14.4 rebounds. During the summer of 1991, he attended a rookie free agent camp in Austin ran by the San Antonio Spurs. The Spurs later signed him as a free agent. During the 1991-92 NBA season, Copa averaged 1.5 points and 1.1 rebounds in 33 total games played.

The following season, he signed with the Houston Rockets but was waived before the start of the season. He later signed with the La Crosse Bobcats in the CBA where he went on to average 8.3 points and 6.7 rebounds in 20 games. In January 1993, he signed with Saski Baskonia. The following season he signed with Italian club Libertas Livorno but was waived after one game. Following his release and due to the toll his playing career had taken on his body, Copa retired from professional basketball.

References

External links
Spanish League profile
Italian League profile
College statistics
NBA statistics

1964 births
Living people
American expatriate basketball people in Belgium
American expatriate basketball people in Italy
American expatriate basketball people in Spain
American men's basketball players
Basketball players from Minnesota
Centers (basketball)
La Crosse Catbirds players
Liga ACB players
Marquette Golden Eagles men's basketball players
People from Robbinsdale, Minnesota
San Antonio Spurs players
Saski Baskonia players
Undrafted National Basketball Association players